Harilal Raishi Shah (14 April 1943 – 11 June 2014) was an East African cricketer from Nairobi, Kenya. He played three One Day Internationals in the 1975 World Cup.

Shah was middle-order batsman who played a first-class game against Sri Lanka in Taunton ahead of that World Cup in which he scored hitting 59 and 33. In three innings of World Cup he scored 6 runs only. He scored ducks in his first two games against New Zealand and India before making 6 against England.

Post retirement, he managed the Kenyan national side including during the 1999 World Cup in England and subsequently became their chief of selectors.

References

External links 

1943 births
2014 deaths
East African cricketers
East Africa One Day International cricketers
Kenyan cricketers
Cricketers at the 1975 Cricket World Cup
East African cricket captains